Akademichesky District  (literally "academic district") is an administrative district (raion) of South-Western Administrative Okrug, and one of the 125 raions of Moscow, Russia. Population: 109,000 (2017 est.). The district contains a number of scientific organizations and research institutions. The streets in the district are named after famous scientists and engineers. The Akademichesky metro station is on the Kaluzhsko-Rizhskaya line (No. 6), with a transfer to the planned Kommunarskaya line (No. 16).

See also
Administrative divisions of Moscow

References

Notes

Sources

Districts of Moscow